Utne is a village in Ullensvang municipality in the Hardanger region of Vestland county, Norway. The village is located on the northern end of the Folgefonn Peninsula, at the confluence of the Sørfjorden and Hardangerfjorden. The village is the site of Utne Church.

Utne is a ferry port with regular ferry routes from Kinsarvik to Kvanndal via Utne, connecting the two sides of the fjord.  Utne is also home to the Utne Hotel, Norway's oldest hotel in continuous operation, founded in 1722.

Name
Utne, in Norwegian, probably has some pre-Germanic elements (i.e. before approx. 200 CE). Other place-names in the area also has an element of pre-Germanic and unknown origins. It has been suggested that it derives from "Út-tún", meaning the hamlet or farmstead that is "out".  This fits with the village's position at the tip of a peninsula that sticks out into the Hardangerfjorden.  This is however uncertain.

Media gallery

References

Villages in Vestland
Ullensvang